National football team may refer to:
List of men's national association football teams
List of women's national association football teams
, website